The Khoe–Kwadi languages are a family consisting of the Khoe languages of southern Africa and the poorly attested extinct Kwadi language of Angola. The relationship has been worked out by Tom Güldemann, Edward Elderkin and Anne-Maria Fehn.

Classification
Pronouns and some basic vocabulary have been reconstructed as being common to Khoe and Kwadi. Because Kwadi is poorly attested, it is difficult to tell which common words are cognate and which might be loans, but about 50 lexical correspondences and a common verb construction have been identified. Westphal's fieldnotes on Kwadi were still being analyzed as of 2018, with the hope that additional grammatical parallels could be identified.

Güldemann (forthcoming) reports the following reconstructed pronominal system, of a minimal/augmented type:

where "E" is an undetermined front vowel and the pronoun base was a deictic like *xa or a generic noun like *kho 'person'. The 3rd-person suffixes were also used on nouns, which in addition had a dual suffix *-da. 

Both Kwadi and the Khoe languages have verb constructions where the first, dependent verb is marked by a suffix *-(a)Ra and the following, finite verb is unmarked.

The nearest relative of Khoe–Kwadi may be the Sandawe isolate; the Sandawe pronoun system is very similar to that of Kwadi–Khoe, but there are not enough known correlations for regular sound correspondences to be worked out. However, the relationship has some predictive value, for example if the back-vowel constraint, which operates in the Khoe languages but not in Sandawe, is taken into account.

Notes

References
Güldemann, Tom and Edward D. Elderkin (2010) 'On External Genealogical Relationships of the Khoe Family.' in Brenzinger, Matthias and Christa König (eds.), Khoisan Languages and Linguistics: the Riezlern Symposium 2003. Quellen zur Khoisan-Forschung 17. Köln: Rüdiger Köppe.
Güldemann and Fehn (2014) 'Kwadi perspective on Khoe verb-juncture constructions'
Güldemann, Tom (forthcoming). 'Person-gender-number marking from Proto-Khoe-Kwadi to its descendants: a rejoinder with particular reference to language contact.'

Further reading
Baucom, Kenneth L. 1974. Proto-Central-Khoisan. In Voeltz, Erhard Friedrich Karl (ed.), Proceedings of the 3rd annual conference on African linguistics, 7-8 April 1972, 3-37. Bloomington: Research Institute for Inner Asian Studies, Indiana University.

 
Language families